At least two ships of the French Navy have been named Polyphème:

 , a  74-gun ship of the line launched in 1817 and decommissioned in 1832
 , a 100-gun  laid down as Polyphème in 1824

French Navy ship names